This is a list of herpetologists who are discussed in Wikipedia articles, in alphabetical order by surname. Some articles are from non-English versions of Wikipedia.

By surname

A

B

C

D

E

F

G

H

I

J

K

L

M

N

O

P

Q

R

S

T

U

V

W

X

Y

Z

See also
 Herpetology
 Herping

herpetologists